Sant'Arsenio is a town and comune in the Province of Salerno in the Campania region of south-western Italy, located about 180 km southeast of Naples and about 76 km southeast of Salerno. As of 30 June 2006, it had a population of 2,714 (1,309 men and 1,405 women) and an area of 20 km2.

Geography
Sant'Arsenio borders the following municipalities: Atena Lucana (SA), Corleto Monforte (SA), Polla (SA), San Pietro al Tanagro (SA), San Rufo (SA) and Teggiano (SA).

Demographic evolution

See also
Vallo di Diano
Alburni

References

External links

 Sant'Arsenio official website

Cities and towns in Campania
Localities of Cilento